John (Fritz) Sumner (13 March 1936, in Blackburn – 2004) was the pre-eminent exploratory climber in his chosen domain of Mid Wales, climbing cutting-edge routes on the remote crags and cliff-faces south of southern Snowdonia starting in the mid-1950s.

Books

References
, John Sumner obituary, Colin Wells, The Independent, 13 March 2004

English mountain climbers
1936 births
2004 deaths
People from Blackburn